County government in Nebraska is organized in one of two models:
Township counties: the county is subdivided into organized townships and governed by a 7-member board of supervisors. This is the form used by 27 counties.
Commissioner counties: the county is governed by a 3-, 5- or 7-member board of commissioners, but is not subdivided into organized townships. This is the form used by 66 counties.

Elected county officials 
Board of Commissioners (commissioner counties) or Board of Supervisors (township counties)
County assessor
County attorney
County clerk
County sheriff
County treasurer
Register of Deeds

Other county officials (such as the county surveyor and the election commissioners) are appointed; in smaller counties, these officials may be shared by multiple counties.

External links
Nebraska Blue Book
Nebraska Association of County Officials

 
Nebraska
County